Andrea Blanch, is an American portrait, commercial, and fine art photographer.

Blanch was born in Brooklyn and raised in Great Neck, New York. She graduated from Ohio State University with a Bachelor of Arts in Painting.

After working under Richard Avedon, Blanch embarked on her own career with Vogue and Elle, later diversifying to celebrity portraits and editorial work. Blanch has had photographs featured on the album covers and in

Rolling Stone magazine. Her commercial clients have included Gucci, Bergdorf Goodman, Adrienne Vittadini.

After contributing to books,  Italian Men: Love and Sex was published in 1998. Italian Men is a compendium of interviews and photographs of Famous Italian men Including Giorgio Armani, Valentino Garavani, Luciano Pavarotti and Franco Zeffirelli.

Solo exhibitions
 Serge Sorokko Gallery, New York: "Italian Men: Love and Sex" - 
 Staley Wise Gallery, New York: "Unexpected Company" - 2006
 La Galerie Basia Embiricos,: "Sensuous" - 2009

References

External links
 Andrea Blanch

Photographers from New York City
Living people
1946 births
Artists from Brooklyn
Ohio State University College of Arts and Sciences alumni
Fashion photographers
American women photographers
Fine art photographers
21st-century American women